Crawford County Junior-Senior High School is a small high school on the south side of Marengo and near Carefree, El Bethel, English, and Pilot Knob. It serves all of Crawford County and parts of Milltown in Harrison County and serves some people in Orange Country.

History
Crawford County High opened in 1976 after the consolidation of the county's 5 former high schools; Milltown Millers, Marengo Cavemen, Patoka Lakers, Leavenworth Wyandottes, and English Raiders.The Jr. High was moved to the high school and the former high schools then turned into the 5 elementary schools and then the later the elementary schools in English and Marengo would fold and the remaining three elementary schools would change names the names to East Crawford Wolfpack, South Crawford Wolfpack, and West Crawford Wolfpack.

Athletics
The Crawford County Wolfpack compete in the Patoka Lake Conference and the Indiana High School Athletic Association. Crawford County's sports include basketball, baseball, wrestling, volleyball, golf, tennis, softball, cross country, track & field, cheerleading, a dance team, and in 2007 the school added football and later the football program would become an independent and a documentary would later be made about the team. The basketball team plays at the school in Ron Ferguson Court and the volleyball team,cheerleading and the dance team. The baseball and softball teams play on fields near the school. The track and field team plays on a track that goes around Breeden Field where the football team plays. The cross country team plays at the school but on a football practice field and they run on a course in the woods. The tennis team plays on courts on the schools property and the golf team and the golf team plays at the near by Lucas Oil Golf Course in English, Indiana. The wrestling team plays at the fairgrounds gym across the road from the high school. In 2017 the boys basketball team went to the state finals and then in 2020 before the pandemic they won the sectional against a rival Paoli in a close game.

Campus

The campus is the place where the hard working students study and learn. The school has a big and beautiful library and a new lunchroom. The campus was renovated in 2021 for the addition to the new middle school being moved to the high school. The middle school campus is a orange and brown wonderland and the hallways really show school pride. It has a nice big lunchroom and auditorium.

Extracurricular activities

Notable faculty
Dennie Oxley - Former member of the Indiana House of Representatives for District 73 (1998-2008)

See also
 List of high schools in Indiana

References

External links
Crawford County Junior-Senior High School

Public high schools in Indiana
Public middle schools in Indiana
Buildings and structures in Crawford County, Indiana
1976 establishments in Indiana